Edgar Pons Ramón (born 16 June 1995 in Barcelona, Spain) is a Spanish former motorcycle racer. He was the FIM CEV Moto2 European champion in 2015 and 2019. He is son of Sito Pons and brother of Axel Pons.

Career
He announced his retirement from racing at the end of the season.

Career statistics

FIM CEV Moto2 European Championship

Races by year
(key) (Races in bold indicate pole position, races in italics indicate fastest lap)

Grand Prix motorcycle racing

By season

By class

Races by year
(key) (Races in bold indicate pole position, races in italics indicate fastest lap)

References

External links

1995 births
Living people
Motorcycle racers from Catalonia
Moto2 World Championship riders
Spanish motorcycle racers
Sportspeople from Barcelona